Jewel of the Nile is the third studio album by American hip-hop duo Nice & Smooth. It was released on June 28, 1994 via Rush Associated Labels with distribution by PolyGram Group Distribution, Inc. Production was handled by Greg Nice, Showbiz, Luis "Phat Kat" Vega, Mark Morales, Mark Spark and Mark C. Rooney. The album peaked at number 66 on the Billboard 200 and at number 13 on the Top R&B/Hip-Hop Albums chart in the United States. Jewel of the Nile spawned two singles: "Old to the New" and "Return of the Hip Hop Freaks".

Track listing

Chart history

References

External links

1994 albums
Nice & Smooth albums
Albums produced by Cory Rooney
Albums produced by Showbiz (producer)